2nd Independent Division of Heilongjiang Provincial Military District(1st Formation) was formed on June 30th 1966 from the Public Security Contingent of Heilongjiang province. The division was composed of seven regiments (5th to 11th) and an independent battalion.

In February 1969 it exchanged its position and designation with 2nd Independent Division of Liaoning Provincial Military District and became the second formation of 2nd Independent Division of Liaoning Provincial Military District().

In 1976 the division was disbanded.

References

IH2
Military units and formations established in 1966
Military units and formations disestablished in 1976